The Austro-Hungarian Navy operated a pair of ironclad warships named SMS Don Juan d'Austria:

, an armored frigate launched in 1862
, a center battery ship launched in 1875

See also

Austro-Hungarian Navy ship names